Hieracium musartutense, a name for a plant in the hawkweed genus Hieracium, has been identified a synonym of two different species:

Hieracium canadense
Hieracium laevigatum

References 

musartutense